The University of North Carolina at Greensboro (UNCG or UNC Greensboro) is a public research university in Greensboro, North Carolina. It is part of the University of North Carolina system. UNCG, like all members of the UNC system, is a stand-alone university and awards its own degrees. UNCG is accredited by the Southern Association of Colleges and Schools Commission on Colleges to award baccalaureate, masters, specialist and doctoral degrees. It is classified among "R2: Doctoral Universities – High research activity".

The university offers more than 100 undergraduate, 61 master's, and 26 doctoral programs. The university's academic schools and programs include the College of Arts & Sciences, the Joseph M. Bryan School of Business & Economics, the School of Education, the School of Health and Human Sciences, the Joint School of Nanoscience & Nanoengineering (one of the first such schools in the nation), the School of Visual and Performing Arts, the School of Nursing, Continual Learning, Graduate School, Warren Ashby Residential College and Lloyd International Honors College. The university is also home to the Weatherspoon Art Museum, which features one of the largest collections of modern American art in the country.

History

Credit for the founding of UNCG goes mainly to Charles Duncan McIver. McIver served the institution as its first chief executive officer with the title of President. This position has also seen various names, with the administrator being known as the Dean of Administration after 1934 and Chancellor from 1945 to present.

The school was established as a women's college by legislative enactment on February 18, 1891, as the State Normal and Industrial School and opened October 5, 1892. The school provided instruction in business, domestic science, and teaching with a student body of 223 and a faculty of 15 in its first year. R. S. Pullen and R. T. Gray gave the original  site in Greensboro, N.C. where the first building was erected with state funds totaling $30,000. It is the first and only public university in North Carolina founded for the purpose of educating women. In 1949, it became the largest all-female institution in the United States.

Following the 1903 commencement, in June 1903, Dr. Charles Duncan McIver issued a report of the school and its progress. McIver stated the school was in "desperate need of two essentials to any high class educational institution," when referring to a gymnasium and a quality library. At the time the chapel of the Curry building on campus was being used for physical activity. He noted that if a donation of $5,000 or $10,000 for either building would allow the university to hopefully build a structure within twelve months.

The school has seen many names over the years, changing from the "State Normal and Industrial School" to the State Normal and Industrial College in 1896, and again in 1919 to North Carolina College for Women. In 1932, it changed to the Woman's College of the University of North Carolina, when it became one of the three charter institutions of the Consolidated University of North Carolina, and changed again to the University of North Carolina at Greensboro when men were first admitted to the school in 1963. It is remembered fondly by many graduates of the Woman's College simply as "the W.C."

UNCG has expanded beyond its traditional borders onto Gate City Boulevard, a major city thoroughfare, with the construction of an 800-bed residence hall for students, and this is just the beginning of the $200 million project on Gate City Boulevard.  The new construction is a mixed-use development, with space for retail and restaurants, along with student residence halls and a new student recreation center. The university's expansion into the West Lee Street Corridor was triggered by UNCG's housing plan, which calls for the university to increase the percentage of undergraduates living in university housing from 30 percent to more than 40 percent over the next decade.

In addition to providing room for UNCG's growth, the expansion also syncs with Greensboro's revitalization plan for the Gate City Boulevard corridor, a main entry point and thoroughfare in the city. The project will also spur economic development in the area. Projections estimate the development will generate more than $590 million in new spending between 2014 and 2023, create 945 new jobs and boost local property revenues by $7.5 million. The expansion has not been without controversy, especially the $91 million athletic center. The athletic center is financed by a mandatory annual fee of $435 charged every UNCG student.

A personnel scandal erupted in 2014. On September 25, UNCG terminated the employment of three persons in the university's public relations department and they were arrested on felony charges of operating a photography business on University time and with University property.    On September 29, the story broke on a  local blog. University faculty and staff protested the firings and arrests. On October 30, the district attorney dropped all criminal charges against the three former employees. UNCG defended reporting the incident to legal authorities, but announced that the former employees had the right to appeal their termination through the personnel grievance system.

On October 20, 2014, Chancellor Linda Brady announced her retirement effective July 31, 2015. Brady said her retirement was not related to the ongoing personnel scandal at the university. On January 27, 2015, the head of the public relations department tendered his resignation, effective February 6.

Recognition and rankings
In its 2021 rankings, U.S. News & World Report ranked UNC Greensboro tied for 258th out of 389 national universities, tied for 126th in its ranking of 209 "Top Public Schools", and 23rd out of 389 universities in "Top Performers on Social Mobility".

In its 2019–2020 rankings, Money magazine ranked UNC Greensboro 509th for "best value" out of 744 universities in the U.S.

In 2020, Washington Monthly ranked UNC Greensboro 96th out of 389 schools on its National Universities list. Washington Monthly assesses the quality of schools based on social mobility, research, and promoting public service.

In 2019, Forbes magazine's "America's Top Colleges" list ranked UNC Greensboro 559th out of 650 universities, liberal arts colleges, and service academies nationwide; 202nd among public universities, and 128th among schools in the South.

Campus

UNCG has an architecturally diverse campus with distinctive landmarks. Historic structures include the Julius I. Foust Building (1891), Spencer Hall (1904, 1907), the Quad (1919–1923), the Chancellor's Residence (1923), the former Aycock Auditorium (1927), renamed to UNCG Auditorium (2016), and Alumni House (1937). Other features include a statue of Minerva, located to the east of Elliott University Center. Minerva has been a part of campus from the first diploma bearing her likeness in 1894 to the statue erected near the center in 2003. Minerva also inspired the university's new graphic identity program, which was launched in 2004.

Other landmarks include "Charlie," a statue of the university's founder Charles Duncan McIver outside Jackson Library. The white tower stacks of the Jackson Library and the Spartan water tower are recognizable structures in the Greensboro community, and the campus is also home to "the Rawk" and the clock tower—two campus landmarks—and school traditions (See Traditions below). A new bell tower at the corner of College Ave. and Spring Garden St. was completed in 2005.

The Fountain is another landmark on UNCG's campus and is a common meeting place for student groups. Visible from parts of the quad all the way to the Elliot University Center and from above in the Jackson Library and "the Caf," the large steps and platform around the fountain are frequently home to demonstrations, performances, and fraternity/sorority functions.

The campus is in close proximity (within 1.5 hours drive) to many other universities — North Carolina Agricultural and Technical State University, Duke, North Carolina Central University, Shaw University, St Augustine’s University, Bennett College, Elon, High Point University, NC State, UNC-Chapel Hill, UNC Charlotte, Wake Forest, and Winston-Salem State University. The university is located about halfway between Washington, DC and Atlanta, Georgia.

The new Nursing Building was completed and opened in January 2021.

Athletics

The intercollegiate athletics program at The University of North Carolina at Greensboro reaches as far back as the late 1940s during the days of the WCUNC, with students participating in national golf tournaments in 1948 and the school hosting the national tournaments for women's golf (1954) and tennis (1965). During the 1980s, all Spartan teams competed in Division III (non-scholarship) and then Division II (scholarship) of the National Collegiate Athletic Association, and all teams have competed in Division 1 since Fall 1991. Between 1982 and 1987 the Men's Soccer team won the NCAA Division III national championship title every year except for 1984. Today UNCG competes in the Southern Conference, which is made up of 10 schools across five states in the Southeast.

The 18 athletic teams currently at UNCG include: Football, Baseball, Men's Basketball, Women's Basketball, Men's Cross Country, Women's Cross Country, Men's Golf, Women's Golf, Men's Soccer, Women's Soccer, Softball, Men's Indoor Track, Women's Indoor Track, Men's Tennis, Women's Tennis, Men's Track, Women's Track, Women's Volleyball.  Wrestling was dropped in the spring of 2011. Although not considered official sports teams, the Athletic Department also includes the UNCG Cheerleading Squad and the UNCG Dance Team, the Spartan Gs.

UNCG's men's basketball team moved into a "new" home in 2009–10, making the Greensboro Coliseum their home court. The move was announced by UNCG chancellor Dr. Linda Brady on December 5, 2008. As a preview of things to come, UNCG hosted Davidson in its new venue two months later and drew a crowd of 11,687. On December 29, 2010, a UNCG record attendance of 22,178 watched the Spartans host the Duke Blue Devils. At full capacity, the building holds more than 23,000 fans for basketball giving UNCG the ability to have potentially one of the largest basketball arenas in the country. UNCG utilizes a variety of configurations for its contests with a minimum capacity of 7,617. As part of the move, the Coliseum remodeled a floor into a Spartan "home floor" and completely renovated a massive locker room space for the team, complete with training room, meeting facilities, coaches offices and a players' lounge. The team is coached by former University of North Carolina at Chapel Hill player Wes Miller, who at the time of his appointment in 2012 was the youngest head coach in Division I.

Former UNCG women's basketball coach Lynne Agee, who retired following the 2010–2011 season, ranks among the most successful coaches in intercollegiate women's basketball history. Currently, she is one of just 45 coaches in the history of the women's game to have engineered more than 600 victories. Under Agee's guidance, UNCG reached the 20-win plateau 16 times. The Spartans also earned berths into the Division I national tournament once, the Division II tournament once and the Division III tournament seven times. With Agee at the helm, UNCG became one of only 10 teams nationally (all divisions) to reach the NCAA tournament each of the first seven years it was held (1982–1988). With UNCG's 1998 NCAA appearance, Agee became the first women's coach in history to take teams to the NCAA tournament in all three divisions. UNCG is now coached by Roxboro, Person County native and former WNBA player Wendy Palmer.

The Blue Crew
The Blue Crew is a student organization dedicated to cheering on the Spartans at athletic events.

Clubs and traditions
UNCG is home to a large number of diverse and active sports and student organizations from Greek life to a radio station, and some traditions unique to the school.

Clubs
In Fall 2010, the Clubs and Organizations affiliated with UNCG included 36 Honor Societies and 20 Fraternities and Sororities. The university also has an active student government association, founded in 1910, Campus Activities Board (CAB), and several foreign culture groups, a Neo-Black Society, PRIDE! (An LGBT support and acceptance group.), Queer Student Collective, The Science Fiction Fantasy Federation, and various performing arts, religious and service programs. Student media groups also produce UNCG's newspaper The Carolinian, CORADDI Fine Arts Magazine, and WUAG 103.1 Campus Radio Station. The campus also includes numerous political organizations for students, including the College Republicans, College Democrats, College Libertarians and the International Socialist Organization and other activist groups including STAND, an organization focused on the situation in the Darfur region of Sudan.

Club sports
All clubs are recognized student organizations through the UNCG's Office of Campus Activities & Programs.

This is a list of clubs that are members of the Club Sports Council:

 Basketball (Women's)
 Bass Fishing
 Equestrian
 Esports
 Fencing
 Football
 Lacrosse (Men's)
 Lacrosse (Women's)
 Quidditch
 Rugby (Men's)
 Rugby (Women's)
 Running
 Soccer (Men's)
 Soccer (Women's)
 Softball
 Swimming
 Tennis
 Ultimate Frisbee (Women's)
 Volleyball

Greek life
UNCG is home to 19 social fraternities and sororities that each have their own traditions. Their main event is Greek Week, a week-long celebration of Greek life and team-building games that take place each year in April. Other events include Greek Treats in October and a luminary display in December.

The following Greek organizations are present at UNCG:

NIC Fraternities:
 Pi Kappa Phi
 Lambda Chi Alpha
 Pi Kappa Alpha
 Sigma Phi Epsilon
 Theta Delta Chi

NPC Sororities:
 Alpha Chi Omega
 Alpha Delta Pi
 Chi Omega
 Sigma Sigma Sigma

NPHC Sororities:
 Alpha Kappa Alpha
 Sigma Gamma Rho
 Zeta Phi Beta

NPHC Fraternities:
 Alpha Phi Alpha
 Kappa Alpha Psi
 Phi Beta Sigma
 Omega Psi Phi

Multicultural Greek Council:
 Alpha Pi Omega
 Theta Nu Xi
 Chi Upsilon Sigma
 Lambda Theta Alpha
 Lambda Theta Phi
 Psi Sigma Phi

NIMC Fraternities and Sororities:
 Phi Mu Alpha Sinfonia
 Mu Phi Epsilon
 Sigma Alpha Iota

Professional Business Fraternities:
 Alpha Kappa Psi
 Delta Sigma Pi

Community Service Fraternity:
 Alpha Phi Omega

Traditions
Some of the most visible traditions at UNCG take place between the university dining hall and the Elliott University Center where "The Rawk" and the clock tower are located.

The Rawk
The Rawk is a large boulder donated by members of Alpha Phi Omega in 1973 and painted nearly every day by students, who use it as a giant message board. Unofficial rules govern the use of the Rawk, and students know not to use foul language and that messages must be left for at least 24 hours before being painted over. Students know when they can begin to paint over the previous message on The Rawk by the two smaller rocks in front of it; one for the date, and one for the time at which the message was painted. The Rawk was originally placed where the fountain is today, on the hill in front of the dining hall.

Clock towers
Students at the university also uphold the tradition of not walking beneath the four-faced clock tower located near the Rawk. It is said that those who walk under the clock will not graduate on time, and some students believe in this almost religiously, avoiding the bricks around the clock tower as well. Only graduates and the occasional unbeliever walk through the middle of the four posts to read the plaque below the clocks.

Students are also told not to depend on the time shown on any of the clock's faces. All four faces tend to show slightly different times.

A new clock and bell tower, the Nicholas A. Vacc Bell Tower, was constructed in 2005 on the site of the old University Bell, at the corner of College Avenue and Spring Garden Street. The bells ring on the hour and on every quarter of the hour in a sequence made famous by the Big Ben chimes.

Other traditions
It is also a tradition each year to give new students a Minerva pin and a daisy—the school flower of UNCG—after student convocation. The daisy was the inspiration for the original two school colors: gold and white. (Navy blue was added to the color palette in 1987 "to provide better visual contrast to publications, merchandise and athletic uniforms.")

Another tradition is the ringing of the university bell to open the academic year at the start of each Fall Semester.

Yet another tradition is to put a wreath of daisies at the foot of the statue of Charles McIver at UNCG and on the grounds of the North Carolina state capitol on Founder's Day. This is done by the alumni of the university.

University libraries 
The UNCG University Libraries system has two branches. They are:
 the Walter Clinton Jackson Library (the main campus library); this includes the Martha Blakeney Hodges Special Collections and University Archives
 the Harold Schiffman Music Library
Other affiliated libraries on campus include:
 the Michel Family Teaching Resources Center and the SELF Design Studio (housed in the School of Education)
 the Intercultural Resource Center Library (located in the Elliot University Center)

Academic units 
UNCG is home to research institutes and centers including the Gateway University Research Park, Center for Applied Research, Center for Creative Writing in the Arts, Center for Drug Discovery, Institute for Community and Economic Engagement, Center for Biotechnology, Genomics & Health Research, Music Research Institute and the Southeastern Regional Vision for Education (SERVE).

The university is organized into one traditional college, one specialty college, one professional college, and seven professional schools:
 College of Arts and Sciences
 College of Visual and Performing Arts
 Lloyd International Honors College
 Joseph M. Bryan School of Business and Economics
 School of Education
 School of Health and Human Sciences
 School of Nursing
 Joint School of Nanoscience and Nanoengineering
 The Graduate School

College of Arts and Sciences
The College of Arts and Sciences is the largest of the eight academic units that make up the university, with almost 500 full-time faculty in 21 academic departments and seven interdepartmental programs, spanning the arts, humanities, social sciences, natural sciences, and mathematics. John Z. Kiss was appointed Dean on July 1, 2016.

UNCG requires all students, no matter what their major, to complete a General Education Curriculum (GEC) that includes courses in the traditional liberal arts, as well as courses that introduce them to new perspectives that have become increasingly important today. The college offers most of the university's general education courses, in addition to the hundreds of more specialized courses that make up its undergraduate majors and graduate programs.

The College of Arts and Sciences has 7,135 undergraduates enrolled  fall semester.

English Department 
The English Department, established in 1893, offers a Bachelor of Arts, Master of Arts, PhD, and multiple minors. The writing program was, and continues to be, one of the most popular and successful parts of department. A writing center was established in 1985 aimed at students in the College of Arts and Sciences. Today, the university Writing Center caters to all students and faculty and is housed under the Division of Student Success along with a Speaking Center, Digital ACT Studio, and Academic Achievement Center. The department is ranked #7 in 2021 in NC for the English BA. The PhD program has been recognized on U.S. News & World Report's 2022 Best Graduate School Rankings as the #3 PhD in English program in NC and #99 overall.

Currently, the English Department is housed in the Moore Humanities and Research Administration Building, but was previously housed in the now demolished McIver Building, which was referred to as "the ugliest classroom building in America."

Notable Alumni & Faculty 
In May 2017, alum Adam Tarleton gave the commencement address. For a brief period in 1973, Nobel prize winner Louise Gluck held a position as a visiting poet.

Notable Emeritus Faculty include: Denise Baker, Fred Chappell, Keith Cushman, and Craig Nova.

Lloyd International Honors College
The Lloyd International Honors College is a selective honors college at The University of North Carolina at Greensboro and provides undergraduate students in all majors an opportunity to reach a higher level of academic achievement in the same time it takes to earn a regular degree.

The college offers three Honors academic programs that allows students to enhance their general-education studies (International Honors Program), work in their major (Disciplinary Honors Program), or their entire undergraduate education while at UNCG (Full Honors Program). All Honors students take special Honors courses that are generally restricted to no more than 20–25 students and often have an interdisciplinary focus. For those who wish to complete International Honors or Full University Honors, an international experience and a second language are required.

Joseph M. Bryan School of Business and Economics 

The Bryan School of Business and Economics is the largest of UNCG's seven professional schools. It was founded in 1969, and is named for Joseph M. Bryan, a prominent figure in North Carolina business and philanthropy. The Bryan School is among the top 1 percent of business schools worldwide that have achieved accreditation in both business and accounting by AACSB International –The Association to Advance Collegiate Schools of Business. The Bryan School has 73 full-time faculty as well as 3,200 undergraduates and 460 graduate students. There are also more than 20,000 alumni.

Dr. McRae C. "Mac" Banks II is the fourth dean of the Joseph M. Bryan School of Business and Economics, who was approved by the UNCG Board of Trustees on March 17, 2011. The first to hold the Virginia Batte Phillips professorship, Dr. Banks started his tenure as Dean on July 1, 2011.

Academic departments 
 Accounting and Finance
 Consumer, Apparel, and Retail Studies
 Economics
 Information Systems and Supply Chain Management
 Management
 Marketing, Entrepreneurship, Hospitality and Tourism

Research centers and institutes 
 Center for Business and Economic Research
 North Carolina Sales Institute

School of Education 

The School of Education has several graduate programs, one notable one being a Doctorate in Philosophy (PhD) in Educational Studies with a Concentration in Cultural Studies from the Educational Leadership and Cultural Foundations Department.

The history of the School of Education of UNCG has its roots in the founding of the university itself. Originally designated in 1891 as the North Carolina State Normal and Industrial School, UNCG was established as a school to train women educators, based on the assumption that if women received training they would, in turn, educate their children and ultimately improve the level of education and literacy in the state.

Founding of "the Normal" was a long time in coming. Although providing state-supported higher education for women in North Carolina had been an occasional topic of discussion among educators, the idea did not appear to be taken seriously until after the Civil War. When the idea was first formally proposed to the state's legislators, all of whom were men, it was overwhelmingly resisted. It was not until Charles Duncan McIver reminded the General Assembly that the state's Constitution asserted "instruction of youth would be provided at low prices and would be encouraged at one or more universities." McIver argued that women were part of its youth and were, therefore, rightfully entitled to an education.

In addition to the constitutional basis for establishing an institution for women, several other factors came into play. First, there was an extensive need for qualified public school teachers, a career path assumed to be especially attractive to women. Also, there was overwhelming evidence that the public school system in North Carolina was among the worst in the nation. For example, the average national expenditure per student enrolled in the public schools was $17.62, but North Carolina spent only $3.36 per student. Similarly, the average national length of the school year was 135 days, but it was only 60 days in North Carolina.

Indeed, for almost a decade after the Normal was founded, the curriculum involved diplomas awarded for work that was distinctly below college level. At the time few public high schools turned out female graduates who were prepared to handle college-level work. The curriculum was gradually modified over time and the Normal School became a full-fledged College in 1897. Baccalaureate degrees followed in 1903 and graduates were awarded a "diploma and life license" to teach in North Carolina.

College of Visual and Performing Arts 

The UNCG College of Visual and Performing Arts is home to over 900 student majors and more than 100 distinguished faculty members. On July 1, 2010, the School of Music was combined administratively with the departments of theater and dance to create the School of Music, Theatre and Dance. In 2016, the Department of Art was transferred from the College of Arts and Sciences, thus giving way to the renaming of the unit. The offices for the new combined school remain in the current music building, with the Art Department remaining at its present location.

Student Organizations include:
 Delta Chi Xi, Alpha chapter
 Mu Phi Epsilon, Alpha-Xi chapter
 Phi Mu Alpha Sinfonia, Iota Epsilon chapter
 Sigma Alpha Iota, Kappa Gamma chapter
 Collegiate Music Educators National Conference
 American Choral Directors Association
 American String Teachers Association
 Graduate Music Student Association
 Society of Composers, Incorporated, Student Chapter
 Alpha Psi Omega

School of Nursing 
The School of Nursing was established in September 1966 under the leadership of the first dean, Eloise R. Lewis. The first class of BSN students graduated in 1970. In 1976, the MSN program was initiated. The School began the PhD program Fall 2005. The School continues to offer both undergraduate and graduate programs with over 4,000 alumni. The School also offers an outreach program in Hickory, North Carolina for RN to BSN students and a concentration in education for MSN students.

The average passage rate for the NCLEX is over 90% for prelicensure graduates and all of the graduates from the nurse anesthesia program are nationally certified. The Adult and Gerontological Nurse Practitioner program leads to eligibility for national certification.

Students have the opportunity for clinical experiences in over 400 agencies throughout the state of North Carolina. The School supports four nursing clinics for the elderly as educational sites for students. All students are advised by nursing faculty.

School of Nanoscience and Nanoengineering
The Joint School of Nanoscience & Nanoengineering ("JSNN") is a collaborative project
between North Carolina Agricultural & Technical State University and UNCG. The mission
of the JSNN is to train students to conduct basic and applied research in nanotechnology.

The Joint School for Nanoscience and Nanoengineering is expected to offer Professional Master of Science and PhD degrees in Nanoscience and Nanoengineering. Nanoscience and Nanoengineering training for scientists and engineers already in the workforce.

Programs of study focus on three main areas: nanobioscience, which emphasizes biological and chemical aspects of nanoscience; nanotechnology, which emphasizes engineering and ecological aspects; and environmental nanoscience, which will address ethical and environmental implications of nanoscience. These programs of study lead to Professional Masters or PhD degrees.  The biological and chemical research emphasis offered by the JSNN is the first in the nation. The only other two existing professional master's programs in nanoscience and nanoengineering are at Rice University and University at Albany, SUNY, neither of which offers a biological or chemical emphasis.

The Graduate School
The Graduate School at The University of North Carolina at Greensboro directs and manages the graduate programs on campus for approximately 3600 graduate students from 33 states and 34 foreign countries.

Some of the activities coordinated by The Graduate School Staff:
 Disseminate program and admission information to prospective students
 Collect and process application materials submitted to the university
 Coordinate the admission process with academic departments
 Assist students with interpretation of policy, course registration and withdrawal
 Monitor academic eligibility
 Review theses/dissertations for formatting requirements
 Process applications for Graduation
 Process degree audits/degree clearances
 Work with the Graduate Studies Committee to approve all new/revised graduate programs, curricula, and policy

Other notable academic units

MFA Writing Program
During the early years, the university had among its faculty a number of noted writers, such as Allen Tate, Caroline Gordon, John Crowe Ransom, Hiram Haydn, Peter Taylor, Robie Macauley and Randall Jarrell. They invited other distinguished writers to campus to read from their work and to meet with students; these writers included Robert Lowell, Robert Frost, Flannery O'Connor, Robert Penn Warren, Eudora Welty, Nobel prize winner Louise Glück and Saul Bellow. In 1965, under the leadership of Robert Watson, creative writing offerings were formalized. Since that time, enrollment has grown, but the faculty has intentionally kept the MFA program small, enabling students to have individual conferences with faculty. Notable faculty members have included Fred Chappell, H.T. Kirby-Smith, Michael Parker, Craig Nova, Stuart Dischell, Jennifer Grotz and David Roderick. Notable graduates include Claudia Emerson, Steve Almond, Keith Lee Morris, Lee Hadaway, Wiley Cash, Linda Carter Brinson, Kelly Cherry, Kathryn Stripling Byer, Mary Ellen Snodgrass, Robert Morgan. and Rodney Jones.

Gateway University Research Park
Gateway University Research Park is a 501(c)3 not-for-profit entity created to manage and operate the joint collaboration between North Carolina A&T State University and UNCG for the purposes of supporting research and economic development within the Triad. Gateway University Research Park aims to attract and retain educational, corporate and community service agencies which advance scientific and educational research in technology. The park consists of two campuses.

A$400 million master plan has been developed for the two campuses of Gateway University Research Park and when fully developed, the research park is anticipated to generate an economic impact of $50 million per year in the Triad. Upon full build out of the project, it is further anticipated that companies and agencies located at the Gateway University Research Park will encompass more than 2,000 employees. The Southeast campus of the research park already houses the aforementioned School of Nanoscience and Nanoengineering.

Residential colleges 
UNCG is home to three residential colleges, as well as an arts-specific dormitory community.

Cornelia Strong College 

Cornelia Strong College was founded in 1994, and was originally housed in Moore-Strong Hall. It is named for Cornelia Strong (1877–1955), professor of mathematics and astronomy in the university from 1905 to 1948.

Cornelia Strong College provides a social and academic community within the context of the larger university. Strong College has a curriculum focused on sustainability. The college is a two-year program, similar to that of Ashby College. After two years at Strong College students take a fieldwork capstone course to "graduate" from the program. Strong College fellows are faculty members who take an active role in the development of Strong College's student members.

Grogan College 
Ione Grogan College, established in 1997 and named after alumna and former professor Ione Grogan, is limited to freshman and serves about 300 students per year. The college is divided into smaller learning communities, each headed by a faculty fellow. The college offers classes that meet general requirements, and ease freshman into the college experience.

Ashby Residential College 
The Warren Ashby Residential College at Mary Foust, established in 1970, is a community of freshman and sophomore students, faculty and staff who live or work in Mary Foust Hall. Also known as RC (or ARC), the college offers small classes, close student and faculty interaction and a rich community living experience.

In addition to freshmen and sophomores, those who have graduated from the program and are rising juniors or seniors may apply to be Mary Foust upperclassmen. Typically 8–12 or so juniors and seniors are selected each year to continue living in Mary Foust as mentors. Each upperclassman is required to complete an "upperclassman project."  These projects are typically activities that support community interaction within Mary Foust.

Many Mary Foust alumni continue to support and participate in Ashby Residential College. Many of the staff are alumni.

Studio 91 
Studio 91, established in 2018, is a residential community of students pursuing artistic disciplines. Also known as Cone Dormitory, Studio 91 offers seminars, activities, and unique access to arts faculty in a rich community living experience. Studio 91 contains practice rooms, dance studios, and spaces for creating visual art. Cross-disciplinary work is also encouraged.

Notable alumni

 Steve Almond – Author of Candyfreak, My Life in Heavy Metal, and The Evil B.B. Chow.
 Norman Anderson – CEO of the American Psychological Association (PhD in clinical psychology from UNCG)
 Gerald Austin – NFL referee
 Jim Avett – musician and father of Scott Avett and Seth Avett of The Avett Brothers
 Tyler Barnhardt, American actor
 Ruth Bellamy (1906-1969), American writer
 Chrystelle Trump Bond, American dancer, choreographer, and dance historian
 Linda Carter Brinson, American editor, writer, and journalist
 Carrie Lougee Broughton, American librarian
 Kathryn Stripling Byer (born 1944) – American poet and teacher; North Carolina Poet Laureate 2005–2009
 Andy Cabic – singer-songwriter for the band Vetiver
 Wiley Cash – author
 J. P. Carter – American politician, educator, and military officer
 Chris Chalk – actor in the Fox show Gotham and the movie 12 Years a Slave.
 Paul Chelimo – 2016 Olympic silver medalist at 5000 meters in track and field.
 Kelly Cherry - Poet Laureate of Virginia 2010-2012
 Ashlei Sharpe Chestnut – Actress and writer
 The Darlinettes – vocal group
James L. Dickey III (born 1996) - basketball player for Hapoel Haifa of the Israeli Basketball Premier League
 Tracy Ducar – professional soccer player
 Claudia Emerson – Pulitzer Prize-winning author
 Sue Ramsey Johnston Ferguson, North Carolina state senator
 Ben Folds - Singer-songwriter, musician, composer, and record producer. Frontman and pianist of the alternative rock band Ben Folds Five.
 Dale Folwell – North Carolina House of Representatives (R), District 74 (2004–present)
 Virginia Foxx – U.S. Representative (R), District 5-NC (2005–present)
 Lee Hall (1934–2017), Painter, writer, educator, and a university president; BFA 1955.
 Daisy Hendley Gold – author, poet, and journalist
 Emily V. Gordon – writer and producer, Academy-Award nominated for her autobiographical film The Big Sick.
 Melanie Greene – dancer and choreographer
 Ione Grogan – academic and educator
 Bertha Harris – Lesbian feminist author
 Emmylou Harris – Grammy-winning Country music/folk singer-songwriter
 Barbara Hervey – Judge of the Texas Court of Criminal Appeals; resides in San Antonio
 Ricky Hickman – professional basketball player in Israel for Maccabi Tel Aviv
 Kyle Hines – basketball player who is one of only six men's players in NCAA history to score 2,000 points, grab 1,000 rebounds, and block 300 shots in a career
 Lauren Holt – actress, comedian, and former cast member of Saturday Night Live
 Brian J. Hutchins – Film director and poet
 Beth Leavel – Tony Award-winning Broadway actress
 Hamid Amni – Seven times Asian Kickboxing Champion and World Martial Arts WMC/GAISF Silver medalist 
 Carol Mann – LPGA Hall of Fame golfer
 Jaylee Burley Mead – astronomer at Goddard Space Flight Center
 Beth Mitchell – competitive shag dancer
 Nadia Moffett – Miss North Carolina USA 2010
 Keith Lee Morris – author of The Dart League King, The Greyhound God, and The Best Seats in the House 
 Alejandro Moreno – retired Venezuelan international soccer player and MLS forward and ESPN soccer analyst
 Robert Morgan – poet, author of Gap Creek, selected by Oprah's Book Club
 Kevin Nanney – professional Super Smash Bros. player (B.A. in Psychology)
 Anne-Claire Niver – singer and songwriter
 Genevieve Oswald – dance archivist at the New York Public Library
 Samwell – internet celebrity made famous by his video "What What (In the Butt)"
 Jessie Rae Scott - First Lady of North Carolina
 Tom Smith – musician, inductee into Jazz Education Hall of Fame
 Mary Peacock Douglas (1903 –1970), American librarian and author
 Mary Ellen Snodgrass – author and two-time New York Public Library award winner
 Emily Spivey – television writer and producer
 Justin Tornow – dancer and choreographer
 Celeste Ulrich (1924–2011) (class of 1946) – educator in physical education
 Danny Valencia (born 1984) – American-Israeli major league baseball player
 Kate Wagner - architecture and culture critic
 Curtis Waters - Musician and Songwriter, best known for his 2020 debut single “Stunnin”

References

External links

 

 
North Carolina
Public universities and colleges in North Carolina
University of North Carolina
Universities and colleges in Greensboro, North Carolina
Universities and colleges accredited by the Southern Association of Colleges and Schools
Educational institutions established in 1891
1891 establishments in North Carolina